Trapelus mutabilis, the desert agama, is a species of agama found in Morocco, Mauritania, Western Sahara, Algeria, Tunisia, Libya, Egypt, Mali, Iraq, Chad, Sudan, and Saudi Arabia.

References

Trapelus
Lizards of Asia
Taxa named by Blasius Merrem
Reptiles described in 1820